Intraflagellar transport protein 80 homolog (IFT80), also known as WD repeat-containing protein 56, is a protein that in humans is encoded by the IFT80 gene.

Function 

IFT80 is part of the intraflagellar transport complex B and is necessary for the function of motile and sensory cilia.

Clinical significance 

Mutations in the IFT80 gene are associated with asphyxiating thoracic dysplasia.

References

Further reading